Yang Chang-seop (Hangul: 양창섭) (born September 22, 1999, in Seoul) is a South Korean pitcher for the Samsung Lions in the Korea Baseball Organization (KBO).

References 

Samsung Lions players
KBO League pitchers
South Korean baseball players
1999 births
Living people